Sooner or Later is a 1920 American silent comedy film directed by Wesley Ruggles and starring Owen Moore, Seena Owen and Clifford Grey. With no holdings located in archives, it is a lost film.

Cast
 Owen Moore as Patrick Murphy
 Seena Owen as Edna Ellis
 Clifford Grey as Robert Ellis 
 Amy Dennis as Mrs. Ellis
 John E. Brennan as Charles Porter 
 Marie Burke as Mrs. Hollander
 Katherine Perry as Miss Hollander

References

Bibliography
 Paul C. Spehr & Gunnar Lundquist. American Film Personnel and Company Credits, 1908-1920. McFarland, 1996.

External links
 

1920 films
1920 comedy films
1920s English-language films
American silent feature films
Silent American comedy films
American black-and-white films
Films directed by Wesley Ruggles
Selznick Pictures films
1920s American films